The Black Music & Entertainment Walk of Fame, located in Atlanta, Georgia, started in January 2021, to honor African Americans, and Black people internationally, with a monument for their achievements in entertainment. The walk of fame is located in the historic Downtown Atlanta area, on the sidewalks of Martin Luther King, Jr. Drive and Northside Drive.

Quincy Jones, Otis Redding, and James Brown were among the first to be honored, as "Foundational Inductees", and were inducted in June 2021. There are seven categories for induction; there are separate male and female categories in both hip-hop and mainstream (the Walk of Fame uses the term "mainstream" to differentiate R&B from hip-hop). While there’s one combined male/female category for legacy artists, gospel and music & entertainment moguls. Thirty-five performers were nominated for the inaugural ceremony. The ceremony was set for June 17, 2021. Other inaugural inductees include Stevie Wonder, Michael Jackson, Beyoncé, Usher, Missy Elliott and Outkast.

Honorees

References

External links 
 
 Black Music & Entertainment Walk of Fame – Twitter
 Black Music & Entertainment Walk of Fame – Instagram
 Black Music & Entertainment Walk of Fame (Official Facebook Group)

Walks of fame
African-American music
Awards established in 2021